Gug Tappeh (also Romanized as Gūg Tappeh and Gūgtappeh) is a village in Gorgin Rural District, Korani District, Bijar County, Kurdistan Province, Iran. At the 2006 census, its population was 46, in 9 families. The village is populated by Azerbaijanis.

References 

Towns and villages in Bijar County
Azerbaijani settlements in Kurdistan Province